Hans Michalsky (born 9 May 1949) is a German former cyclist. He competed in the 1000m time trial event at the 1976 Summer Olympics.

References

External links
 

1949 births
Living people
German male cyclists
Olympic cyclists of West Germany
Cyclists at the 1976 Summer Olympics
Sportspeople from Neuss
Cyclists from North Rhine-Westphalia
20th-century German people